Forchheim may refer to the following places in Germany:

 Forchheim, a town in Bavaria
 Forchheim (district), in Bavaria
 Forchheim am Kaiserstuhl, a municipality in Baden-Württemberg 
 Forchheim (Rheinstetten), part of Rheinstetten, Baden-Württemberg 
 Forchheim, a subdivision of Pockau, Saxony
 Forchheim, a part of Ziegra-Knobelsdorf, Saxony